Horrors of the Black Museum (1959) is a British-American horror film starring Michael Gough and directed by Arthur Crabtree.

It was the first film in what film critic David Pirie dubbed Anglo-Amalgamated's "Sadian trilogy" (the other two being Circus of Horrors and Peeping Tom), with an emphasis on sadism, cruelty and violence (with sexual undertones), in contrast to the supernatural horror of the Hammer films of the same era.

Plot
A package is delivered to Gail, a young blonde woman with a roommate named Peggy. Gail opens the package to find a pair of binoculars, but when she uses them to look out a window, she screams and collapses, dying. The binoculars are revealed to have two spikes emerging out of the eyepiece.

Peggy is being interviewed by Superintendent Graham and Inspector Lodge when journalist and crime writer Edmond Bancroft enters the room. He wishes to see the binoculars for himself, and Graham remarks on their similarity to binoculars in Scotland Yard's "Black Museum".

Bancroft then purchases a dagger at Aggie's antique shop. Returning to his house, he enters his secret basement museum with his assistant Rick. The museum exhibits various weapons and implements of torture used by criminals.

Bancroft visits his doctor, Dr. Ballan, and tells him that he cannot rest until the killer is apprehended. Ballan observes that Bancroft goes into a state of shock after the murders, noting that he needs psychiatric treatment and should be hospitalized.

Bancroft later visits his mistress Joan in her flat, who argues with him, asking for money and calling him a cripple. Joan leaves her apartment for a bar where she dances provocatively to music from a jukebox. She returns to her flat and prepares to sleep, but when she lays down on her bed she gasps, seeing a guillotine and a man with a hideous face above her bed frame. When the guillotine blade falls she screams, gathering curious neighbors at her door. The hideous man pushes his way through this crowd when he makes his escape. Graham investigates, questioning the crowd of neighbors who mention the man's strange appearance.

At a cocktail party, Graham tells Bancroft that the police have captured Tom Rivers, who has confessed to the murders. Rivers later admits to various other famous crimes, revealing himself to be a fantasist, but Graham keeps Rivers to try to capture the true culprit. Bancroft hears of Rivers' confession and requests to see Rivers, but Graham explains that Rivers has been sent to a mental hospital.

Rick sneaks away from his duties with Bancroft to meet his fiancée, Angela, and he explains that he is being hypnotized and controlled by Bancroft.

When Bancroft returns to the antique shop to purchase ice tongs, Aggie reveals that she knows that Bancroft uses the weapons he buys to murder. She demands £1200 for the tongs to not tell the police. Bancroft uses the tongs to murder her.

Ballan visits Bancroft and explains that he needs psychiatric help. Bancroft knocks out the doctor with a laser from his machine in his basement "Black museum". Rick chains the body then lowers it into a vat of acid. When Rick pulls out the chain only a skeleton is left.

After signing copies of his books at an event, Bancroft returns to his basement museum to find Rick with Angela. When Angela leaves, Bancroft injects Rick with a drug to better control his actions. Bancroft explains that Rick will inherit the "Black museum" when Bancroft dies and commands Rick to deal with Angela.

Later, at a carnival, Angela and Rick ride in the Tunnel of Love. Towards the end of the tunnel, a transformed and hideous Rick takes out a knife and stabs Angela, killing her. Fleeing through the hall of mirrors, Rick is chased by police up a Ferris Wheel. Bancroft is with Graham when he hears that the murderer is trapped. They both arrive at the carnival where policemen are asking Rick to climb down. Rick, slurring, addresses Bancroft, who frantically urges the policemen to kill the monster before he reveals Bancroft's secret. Rick jumps from the wheel and plunges his knife into Bancroft's heart.

Looking at the two men on the ground, Superintendent Graham remarks that the case of the "monster killer" has been solved.

Cast
 Michael Gough as Edmond Bancroft
 June Cunningham as Joan Berkley
 Graham Curnow as Rick
 Shirley Anne Field as Angela Banks
 Geoffrey Keen as Superintendent Graham
 Gerald Andersen as Dr. Ballan
 John Warwick as Inspector Lodge
 Beatrice Varley as Aggie
 Austin Trevor as Commissioner Wayne
 Malou Pantera as Peggy
 Howard Greene as Tom Rivers
 Dorinda Stevens as Gail Dunlap
 Stuart Saunders as Strength-Test Barker
 Hilda Barry as Woman in Hall
 Nora Gordon as Woman in Hall
 Vanda Godsell as Miss Ashton
 Gerald Case as Bookshop Manager
 Geoffrey Denton as Sergeant at Jail
 William Abney as Patrol Constable No. 1
 Howard Pays as Patrol Constable No. 2
 Frank Henderson as Medical Examiner
 Garard Green as Fingerprint Expert
 Sydney Bromley as Neighbour
 John Harvey as Man in Bookshop
 Marianne Stone as Neighbour

Production
Producer Herman Cohen said he got the idea for the film after reading a series of newspaper articles about Scotland Yard's Black Museum. He arranged through a contact to visit the museum, then wrote a treatment and later collaborated with Aben Kandel on the screenplay. Cohen says the use of binoculars as murder weapons, and all the other instruments of death in the film, were based on real-life murder cases.

Half the money for the budget was provided by Nat Cohen and Stuart Levy of Anglo-Amalgamated in the UK, the other half from American International Pictures. It was the first movie from AIP in CinemaScope and colour.

The credited producer was Jack Greenwood, but Herman Cohen says this came about to ensure the film qualified for the Eady levy, and in fact, Greenwood was more of an associate producer assisting Cohen.

Cohen wanted to hire Vincent Price for the lead and also considered Orson Welles, but Anglo-Amalgamated pushed for a British actor in the lead, as it would be cheaper, so they decided to use Michael Gough. Arthur Crabtree was hired on the basis of his work on Fiend Without a Face."The price was right, and the old guy needed a job and I hired him", recalled Cohen. "And he was exactly what I wanted and needed as a good craftsman."

A thirteen-minute prologue featuring hypnotist Emile Franchele and HypnoVista was added for the US release by James H. Nicholson of AIP, who felt the movie needed another gimmick. "We tested it in a few theaters, and the audience went for it like crazy...hokey as it was", recalled Cohen. "It helped make the picture a success, I guess, 'cause people were looking for gimmicks at that time."

Release
The film was given a wide release in the US on a double bill with The Headless Ghost. 

It was very popular and earned over $1 million in profits. According to Kinematograph Weekly the film performed "better than average" at the British box office in 1959.

Cohen estimated 72% of the audience for this sort of film was aged between 12 and 26.

Cohen says when the movie was released on television they had to take off the hypnotism prologue "because it does hypnotize some people."

The film was later inducted into the Museum of Modern Art at the behest of Martin Scorsese.

Reception

References

External links
 

Horrors of the Black Museum at BFI Screenonline
Review of film at Variety

1959 films
American horror films
British horror films
1959 horror films
American International Pictures films
Films directed by Arthur Crabtree
Films set in museums
1950s English-language films
1950s American films
1950s British films